Phlegmariurus varius, is a fir moss or club moss in the family Lycopodiaceae found in areas of Australia, New Zealand and associated islands. It has a number of synonyms including Huperzia varia.

Phlegmariurus varius can grow on the ground and as a lithophyte or epiphyte. It can have one or many branches that are spirally arranged with slender leaves that narrow to a point. The plant varies from green to green-yellow and is sometimes orange in appearance. A recent article provides morphological and genetic evidence to separate Phlegmariurus billardierei, the only species of Lycopodiaceae endemic to New Zealand, from P. varius.

varius
Flora of Australia
Flora of New Zealand